Alfonso Rangel Guerra (born 16 November 1928, Monterrey, Nuevo León) is a Mexican lawyer, educator, writer and administrator.

Career
He received his law degree from the Autonomous University of Nuevo León (UANL) in 1953. From 1958 to 1959, he had a scholarship which enabled him to study French literature at the Instituto Francés de América Latina and the Sorbonne. He served as Rector at UANL from 1962 to 1964, and is currently the Director of UANL's Center for Humanistic Studies. Over the years, he has held many professorships and administrative positions there. He has twice served as the Secretary of Education and Culture for the state of Nuevo León (1988-1991, 1996-1997).

Outside his home state, he has been the Executive Secretary of the National Association of Universities and Higher Education Institutions (ANUIES) (1965–67); Director General of Higher Education for the Secretariat of Public Education (1978-1982); Cultural Attaché at the Mexican Embassy in Spain (1983–85) and Secretary General of the College of Mexico (1985–88).

Honors and awards
 1989: Became a corresponding member of the Academia Mexicana de la Lengua
 2007: Doctor Honoris Causa at the Autonomous University of Baja California (UABC)
 2009: Alfonso Reyes International Prize

Selected works
 La Educación Superior en México, El Colegio de México (1979) 
 Las Ideas Literarias de Alfonso Reyes, El Colegio de México (1993) 
 La Cuarta Presencia: Ensayos, Castillo (1995) 
 Universidad y Humanismo, Fondo Editorial de Nuevo León (2009) 
 La Opacidad y la Transparencia, Pendola (2010)

References

External links
 Dialnet: Works by Alfonso Rangel Guerra

Mexican educators
Academic staff of the National Autonomous University of Mexico
1928 births
Living people
Writers from Monterrey
Autonomous University of Nuevo León alumni
University of Paris alumni
Mexican expatriates in France